WEZG-LP (102.5 FM) is a radio station licensed to serve the community of Statesville, North Carolina. The station is owned by Covenant Broadcasting Company of Statesville, Inc. It airs an easy listening format.

The station was assigned the call sign WWRO-LP by the Federal Communications Commission on May 15, 2014. It changed its call sign to WEZG-LP on July 5, 2019

References

External links
 

EZG-LP
EZG-LP
Radio stations established in 2017
2017 establishments in North Carolina
Easy listening radio stations
Iredell County, North Carolina